Despite the crisis in Syria, agriculture remains a key part of the economy. The sector still accounts for an estimated 26 percent of gross domestic product (GDP) and represents a critical safety net for the 6.7 million Syrians – including those internally displaced - who still remain in rural areas. However, agriculture and the livelihoods that depend on it have suffered massive losses
. Today, food production is at a record low and around half the population remaining in Syria are unable to meet their daily food needs.

Until the mid-1970s, agriculture in Syria was the primary economic activity in Syria. At independence in 1946, agriculture (including minor forestry and fishing) was the most important sector of the economy, and in the 1940s and early 1950s, agriculture was the fastest growing sector. Wealthy merchants from urban centers such as Aleppo invested in land development and irrigation. The rapid expansion of the cultivated area and increased output stimulated the rest of the economy. However, by the late 1950s, there was little land left that could easily be brought under cultivation. During the 1960s, agricultural output stagnated because of political instability and land reform. Between 1953 and 1976, agriculture's contribution to GDP increased (in constant prices) by only 3.2%, approximately the rate of population growth. From 1976 to 1984 growth in agriculture declined to 2% a year, and its importance in the economy declined as other sectors grew more rapidly.

In 1981, as in the 1970s, 53% of the population was still classified as rural, although movement to the cities continued to accelerate. However, in contrast to the 1970s, when 50% of the labor force was employed in agriculture, by 1983 agriculture employed only 30% of the labor force. Furthermore, by the mid-1980s, unprocessed farm products accounted for only 4% of exports, equivalent to 7% of non-petroleum exports. Industry, commerce, and transportation still depended on farm produce and related agro-business, but agriculture's preeminent position had clearly eroded. By 1985 agriculture (including a little forestry and fishing) contributed only 16.5% to GDP, down from 22.1% in 1976.

By the mid-1980s, the Syrian government had taken measures to revitalize agriculture. The 1985 investment budget saw a sharp rise in allocations for agriculture, including land reclamation and irrigation. The government's renewed commitment to agricultural development in the 1980s, by expanding cultivation and extending irrigation, promised brighter prospects for Syrian agriculture in the 1990s.

During the Syrian Civil War, the agricultural sector has witnessed a drop in producing all kinds of commodities such as wheat, cotton and olives, due to the lack of security and immigration of agricultural workforce, especially in Al-Hasakah Governorate and Aleppo Governorate.

Water resources
Water is a scarce resource in Syria as it is throughout the Middle East, but Syria is more fortunate than many other countries. Sufficient rainfall supports cultivation in the Fertile Crescent - an arc from the southwest, near the border with Israel and Lebanon, extending northward to the Turkish border and eastward along that border to Iraq. The other main area of cultivation is along the Euphrates and its major tributaries and is dependent on irrigation.

Rainfall is highest along the Mediterranean coast and on the mountains just inland, with Syria's limited forestry activities being concentrated in the higher elevations of these mountains. Rainfall diminishes sharply as one moves eastward of the mountains paralleling the coast and southward from the Turkish border. The arc of cultivation from the southwest (and east of the coastal mountains) to the northeast is largely semiarid, having as annual rainfall between 300 and 600 millimeters. Areas south and east of the arc receive less than 300 millimeters of rain annually, classifying the land as arid. Grass and coarse vegetation suitable for limited grazing grow in part of this arid belt, and the rest is desert of little agricultural value.

Rainfall is mainly between October and May. Without irrigation, cropping is finished by winter, when the climate is very hot and dry. Moreover, the amount of rainfall and its timing varies considerably from year to year, making rain-fed farming extremely risky. When rains are late or inadequate, farmers do not even plant a crop. Successive years of drought are not uncommon and cause havoc not only for farmers but for the rest of the economy. In the mid-1980s, about two-thirds of agricultural output (plant and animal production) depended on rainfall.

Irrigation
Extension and improvement of irrigation could substantially raise agricultural output. For example, in 1985, because of the expansion of irrigation, Syria's agricultural output rose 10% above the drought-plagued yield of 1984. Yields from irrigated fields have been several times higher than from rain-fed fields, and many irrigated areas could grow more than a single crop a year. Development of irrigation systems, however, is both costly and time-consuming.

Syria's major irrigation potential lies in the Euphrates River valley and its two major tributaries, the Balikh and Khabur rivers in the northeast portion of the country. The Euphrates is the largest river in Southwest Asia which originated in Turkey, where relatively heavy rain and snowfall provide runoff most of the year. The river flows southeastward across the arid Syrian Plateau into Iraq, where it joins the Tigris River shortly before emptying into the Persian Gulf. In addition to Syria, both Turkey and Iraq use dams on the Euphrates for hydroelectric power, water control, storage, and irrigation. In the mid-1980s, about a half of the annual Euphrates River flow was used by these three countries.

Syrians have long used the Euphrates for irrigation, but, because the major systems were destroyed centuries ago, they now make only limited use of the river's flow. In the mid-1980s, the Euphrates River accounted for over 85% of the country's surface water resources, but its water was used for only about two-fifths (200,000 hectares) of the land then under irrigated cultivation. In 1984, about 44% of irrigated land still used water from wells. Several project studies were conducted after World War II, and, in the 1960s, the Soviet Union agreed to provide financial and technical assistance for the Tabqa Dam, a large hydroelectric power station, and portions of the major Euphrates irrigation project.

The dam, located at al-Thawrah, a short distance upriver from the town of Raqqa, is earth fill, 60 meters high and four and a half kilometers long. Construction began in 1968, and work was essentially completed by 1978. The Rabqa Dam was closed in 1973, when Lake Assad, the artificial lake behind the dam, began filling. About 80 kilometers long, Lake Assad averages about 8 kilometers in width and holds nearly 12 billion cubic meters of water. The power plant has eight 100-megawatt turbines for power generation and transmission lines to Aleppo. Until 1983, the power station operated at 65% of capacity, generating 2,500 megawatts a year or about 45% of Syria's electricity. In 1986, the power station operated at only 30 to 40% of capacity because of the low water level in Lake Assad. Provisions were made, however, for future construction to raise the height of the dam, increase the capacity of Lake Assad by about 10%, and increase the number of turbines. In 1984, as a result of the disappointing performance of the dam, the government studied the possibility of building a second dam upstream from al-Thawrah between Ash Shajarah, situated on the northern edge of Lake Assad, and Jarabulus, located near the Turkish border. The ultimate goal of the Euphrates irrigation project is to provide 640,000 cultivable hectares by the year 2000, in effect doubling the area of Syria's irrigated land in the mid-1970s. In 1978, observers believed that 20,000 to 30,000 hectares of land had been irrigated and that new housing, roads, and farms had been completed for the 8,000 farmers displaced by the creation of Lake Assad. In the early 1980s, Syrian officials had anticipated the completion of irrigation on about 50,000 to 100,000 hectares in the Euphrates basin, with about 20,000 hectares planned for completion each year after that. The Fourth Five-Year Plan actually called for irrigating an additional 240,000 hectares by the end of the plan. In 1984, however, Syrian government statistics revealed that only 60,000 hectares were actually being irrigated. Ten years after its inception, the Euphrates irrigation project irrigated only about 10% of its long-term goal.

A variety of complex, interrelated problems frustrated realization of targeted irrigation goals. Technical problems with gypsum subsoil, which caused irrigation canals to collapse, proved more troublesome than at first anticipated. Large cost overruns on some of the irrigation projects made them much more expensive than planned and created difficulties in financing additional projects. Moreover, these large irrigation projects required several years before returns on the investments began. There was also doubt about whether farmers could be attracted back from urban areas or enticed from more crowded agricultural areas to the sparsely populated Euphrates Valley. Another complication is that the Euphrates flow is insufficient for the irrigation needs of the three countries—Turkey, Iraq, and Syria that share the river. In 1962, talks on allotment of Euphrates water began and continued sporadically throughout the 1970s and early 1980s, but acrimonious relations between Syria and Iraq hampered final agreements. In fact, in 1978 when Syria began filling Lake Assad and water to Iraq was greatly reduced, the two countries almost went to war. In addition, Turkey's use of Euphrates' waters for its Keban Dam assures that water levels in Lake Assad will remain low. This problem will undoubtedly continue into the 1990s, when Turkey completes construction of the Atatürk Dam.

By 1987, numerous Euphrates irrigation projects and additional irrigation projects throughout the country were proceeding, but what had been accomplished was not clear. Projects initiated in the 1980s included irrigation of 21,000 hectares in the Raqqa area pilot project, 27,000 hectares reclaimed in the Euphrates middle-stage project, and about half of a 21,000-hectare plot reclaimed with Soviet assistance in the Maskanah region. There were also major irrigation schemes involving 130,000 hectares in the Maskanah, Ghab valley, and Aleppo Plains project. In addition, Syria completed a small regulatory dam with three seventy-megawatt turbines approximately twenty- five kilometers downstream from Tabaqah. In the mid-1980s, work continued on the Baath Dam, located twenty-seven kilometers from the Euphrates dam, and the Tishrin Dam on the Kabir ash Shamali River near Latakia evolved from the planning to implementation stage. The government also planned to construct as many as three dams on the Khabur River in northeast Syria and more effectively use the waters of the Yarmuk River in southwest Syria. Foreign contractors carried out most of these major development projects. The Soviets and Romanians were particularly active in irrigation schemes as part of their economic aid programs. French, British, Italian, and Japanese firms, the World Bank, and Saudi Arabian and Kuwaiti development assistance funds were deeply involved in financing and implementing these projects.

In the 1980s, there was good potential for expanding and refining irrigation in the western portion of Syria. The government obtained economical results using small impoundments that held winter runoffs to supplement rain-fed cultivation and to provide some summer irrigation. Small storage areas for water from wells and springs permitted additional irrigation. Farmers, however, had not yet turned to sprinkler systems or trickle irrigation, which would considerably reduce the amount of water needed for cultivation.

Land use
The bulk of the country is arid, with little vegetation. In 1984, nearly 20% was classified as desert, and another 45% was classified as steppe and pasture, although its grazing capacity was very limited. Less than 3% of the land was forested, with only part of it commercially useful. Cultivatable land amounted to 33% of the total area. In 1984, 91.7% of the total cultivable area of 6.17 million hectares was cultivated.

Major expansion of the cultivated area occurred in the 1940s and 1950s. Much of the expansion was the result of investment by wealthy urban merchants, many of whom were from the country's religious minorities. Their innovations included large-scale use of farm machinery, pumps, and irrigation where possible, and different tenure arrangements for farm operators than were used in other parts of the country. But the efforts of the merchants of Aleppo and other commercial centers largely exhausted the potential for bringing new land under cultivation. The area of cultivation (6.9 million hectares) and land irrigated (760,000 hectares) peaked in 1963 and has been appreciably smaller since then. In 1984, approximately 5.7 million hectares were under cultivation, with 618,000 irrigated.

Opinions differ as to the causes of the decline of cultivated and irrigated areas after 1963. Some observers say that marginal lands brought under cultivation proved uneconomical after a few years and were abandoned. Others claim that the merchant developers used exploitative techniques that eventually reduced the productivity of the soil. Still other observers blame land-reform measures, which coincided with the decline of the cultivated and irrigated areas. Each view is probably somewhat valid.

In the future, expansion of the cultivated area will be slow and costly. Although the Euphrates irrigation projects will provide water to bring additional land under cultivation, growth will be partly offset by the loss of arable land to urban expansion, roads, and other facilities for a growing population. After the disappointing results of the Euphrates irrigation projects through the mid-1980s, the government began to develop rain-fed agriculture to offset potential setbacks in the Euphrates scheme. Drainage investments also will be required to maintain cultivation on some irrigated areas that currently suffer from water logging or excessive salinity.

Land reform

The dynamism of the agricultural sector caused by the opening of new farmland in the north and northeast through investments of wealthy merchants worsened the situation for the poor and often landless rural population. In 1950 the first Syrian constitution placed a limit on the size of farm holdings, but the necessary implementing legislation was not passed until 1958, after the union of Syria and Egypt.

The 1958 agrarian reform laws were similar to those in Egypt and not only limited the size of landholdings but also provided sharecroppers and farm laborers with greater economic and legal security and a more equitable share of crops. The Agricultural Relations Law laid down principles to be observed in administering tenancy leases, protected tenants against arbitrary eviction, and reduced, under a fixed schedule, the share of crops taken by landlords. It also authorized agricultural laborers to organize unions and established commissions to review and fix minimum wages for agricultural workers.

However, by the time Syria withdrew from the merger with Egypt in 1961, opposition from large landowners, administrative difficulties, and severe crop failures during the prolonged 1958- 61 drought had effectively curtailed movement toward land reform. The conservative regime in power from 1961 until March 1963 blocked implementation of the land-reform program in practice by enacting a number of amendments to the original law that substantially raised the ceilings on ownership and opened loopholes.

Shortly after the Baath Party seized power in March 1963, Decree Law 88 of 1963 was promulgated, canceling the actions of the previous regime and reinstating the original agrarian reform laws with important modifications. One of the most significant modifications was lowering the limit on the size of holdings and providing flexibility in accordance with the productivity of the land. The new ceilings on landownership were set at between 15 and 55 hectares on irrigated land and 80 and 300 hectares on rain-fed land, depending on the area and rainfall. Land in excess of the ceilings was to be expropriated within five years. The compensation payable to the former owners was fixed at ten times the average three-year rental value of the expropriated land, plus interest on the principal at the rate of 1.5 percent for forty years.

The expropriated land was to be redistributed to tenants, landless farmers, and farm laborers in holdings of up to a maximum of eight hectares of irrigated land or thirty to forty five hectares of rain-fed land per family. Beneficiaries of the redistribution program were required to form state-supervised cooperatives. The 1963 law reduced the price of redistributed land to the beneficiaries to the equivalent of one-fourth of the compensation for expropriation. The land recipients paid this amount in equal installments to their cooperatives over a twenty-year period to finance such cooperative activities as development, dispensaries, schools, and cultural centers.

By 1975 (the latest available data in early 1987) 1.4 million hectares (68,000 hectares of irrigated land) had been expropriated, primarily in the early years of the program. Distribution moved much more slowly. By 1975, redistributed land had amounted to 466,000 hectares (61,000 hectares of irrigated land) and undistributed land to 351,000 hectares. In addition, there were 254,000 hectares of land that had been allocated to cooperatives, ministries, and other organizations, and 330,000 hectares that were categorized as excluded and sold land. Although it was far from clear what the disposition was in the latter two categories, the statistical data gave the impression that land reform had not transformed the former numerous farm sharecroppers and laborers into landowners. This impression was supported by government data indicating that slightly more than 50,000 family heads (over 300,000 people) had received land under the reform program. In addition, at various times the government offered state farmland for sale to the landless on the same terms as expropriated land, but reported sales were relatively small; farmers apparently chose to lease the land.

Most observers credited land reform measures with liquidating concentration of very large estates and weakening political power of landowners. Some government data of uncertain coverage and reliability indicated that before land reform more than half of agricultural holdings consisted of one hundred hectares or more, but after reform such large holdings amounted to less than 1 percent. The same data showed that smallholdings (seven hectares or less) had increased from about one-eighth before land reform to just over one-half of total holdings after reform, and that 42 percent of holdings were between eight and twenty-five hectares. Other government statistics indicated that holdings of twenty five hectares or less, representing 30 percent of all land under cultivation before 1959, represented 93 percent in 1975. A May 1980 Order in Council mandated additional expropriations and further reduced the size of agricultural holdings. Data from the 1970 census revealed that the average farm holding was about ten hectares, and that one-fifth of the rural population remained landless. Despite the Baath Party's commitment to land reform, the private sector controlled 74 percent of Syria's arable land in 1984.

Role of government

Government involvement in agriculture was minimal prior to Syria's union with Egypt. Although state intervention in the agricultural sector increased following the union, the government avoided playing a direct role in cultivation. In 1984, private farmers tilled 74 percent of the cultivated land, cooperatives 25 percent, and public organizations (essentially state farms) 1 percent.

Government involvement arose indirectly from socialist transformation measures in various parts of the economy and directly from government efforts to fill the void in the countryside caused by land reform. As an example of the former, the Agricultural Cooperative Bank, a private bank established in the eighteenth century but inherited by the socialist regime, in the mid-1960s became the single source for direct production credits to farmers. The bank had limited funds and confined itself almost completely to short-term financing, the bulk of which went to cotton growers. Part of its lending was in kind—primarily seeds, pesticides, and fertilizers at subsidized prices. Although the bank appeared effective, there was insufficient credit through the 1960s and early 1970s for farmers who did not grow cotton and for long-term loans for such needs as machinery or capital improvements. In the mid-1970s, the flow of funds to the bank increased, thus allowing it to expand its lending to the agricultural sector. The bank became an important influence in shaping farmers' production decisions, particularly in cotton.

In the 1960s, government marketing organizations for the major agricultural commodities were established. The Cotton Marketing Organization, as noted, had a complete monopoly. Organizations for tobacco and sugar beets had purchasing monopolies, set the farm purchase prices, and supervised the processing and marketing of their respective commodities. An organization for grains set prices, purchased some of the farmers' surplus, and supervised the marketing of the remainder through private dealers. The government also set prices for several other agricultural commodities, most imports, and many consumer items.

Some economists attributed part of the stagnation in agriculture to the government's pricing of farm produce. Farm prices remained unchanged over long periods and by the 1970s and 1980s were quite low relative to world prices. Some smuggling out of farm products for sale in Turkey, Iraq, and Lebanon resulted as well as some black marketing in controlled commodities. Pricing also was not coordinated to achieve agricultural goals. Although the Ministry of Agriculture attempted to get farmers to increase wheat production, the government's desire to keep basic food costs low for urban consumers imposed low grain prices for farmers. The ministry also urged farmers to shift irrigated areas from cotton to wheat at the same time that the farm price of cotton was raised relative to that of wheat.

Aware of the problems, officials made efforts to improve pricing policy. By 1977 prices paid to farmers had risen substantially and favored grains and some industrial crops over cotton. In fact, the 1977 prices (when converted to dollars at the official exchange rate) paid to farmers for wheat, soybeans, and sugar beets were substantially higher (more than 100 percent for wheat) than the prices paid to American farmers for those products. In 1985 the government again raised procurement prices for a variety of crops. Prices for hard wheat rose by 9 percent, soft wheat by 14 percent, red lentils by 13 percent, white lentils by 18 percent, and barley by 22 percent from the preceding year.

When land reform was introduced, those receiving expropriated or government land were required to join farm cooperatives. Cooperatives were expected to furnish the organization, techniques, credit, and joint use of machinery to replace and expand the functions supplied by the landowners and managers of the large estates. Syrian farmers' individualism and aversion to cooperatives may explain their apparent preference for renting land from the government rather than buying the land and having to join a cooperative. Whether the cause was aversion by farmers or an inability by the government to organize and staff cooperatives, as some economists suggest, the cooperative movement grew slowly until the early 1970s, but accelerated thereafter. In 1976 there were 3,385 agricultural cooperatives with 256,000 members—more than double the number and membership in 1972. By 1984 there were 4,050 agricultural cooperatives with 440,347 members. Statistics do not distinguish between cooperatives for farmers receiving expropriated or government land and voluntary cooperatives of established landowners.

Officials expected cooperatives eventually to mitigate, if not eliminate, two serious agricultural problems. First, farmers tended to specialize in certain crops without practicing crop rotation. Second, substantial amounts of arable land were left fallow each year. In the 1970s, government extension workers and cooperatives strongly urged farmers to rotate cropping in a pattern that would maintain the fertility of the soil and avoid having cultivable fields left fallow. Cooperatives were also expected to facilitate the use of machinery after land reform reduced the average size of farms, partly by cooperative ownership of equipment and partly by pooling small plots into an economically sized bloc that would then be cultivated as a single unit in the cropping rotation. By 1986 it was not clear how much success cooperatives had achieved in crop rotation or mechanization, but statistics showed an accelerated use of farm equipment by the agricultural sector after the October 1973 War.

Cropping and production

Because only about 16% of the cropped area was irrigated, the output of agriculture (both plant and animal) was heavily dependent on rainfall. The great variation in the amounts and timing of rainfall can immediately cause very substantial shifts in areas planted, yields, and production, but the effect on livestock is less predictable. When drought is unusually severe or prolonged, loss of animals may depress livestock production for several years. In 1984 crop production accounted for 72 percent of the value of agricultural output; livestock and animal products, 28 percent. Livestock alone, not counting products such as milk, wool, and eggs, were 11 percent of the total.

In 1984, crop production amounted to LS 13.6 billion. The United States Department of Agriculture (USDA) valued Syrian 1985 production at US$1.1 billion. Grains contributed 15 percent to the value of total crop production in 1984, in contrast to 41 percent in 1974. Industrial crops remained 20 percent of the total. Fruits rose from 15 to 25 percent of the total, and vegetables rose from 16 to 35 percent. In 1984, grain continued to be planted on 66 percent of the cultivated land, consistent with the mid-1970s percentage.

Fluctuations in rainfall resulted in major variations in crop production throughout the 1980s. In 1980, wheat was planted on 1.4 million hectares, yielding 2.2 million tons—the largest wheat harvest since the early 1960s. In 1984, wheat planted on 1.1 million hectares produced only 1.1 million tons. In 1980 and 1984, barley was planted on 1.2 million hectares, but production fell from 1.6 million tons in 1980, the peak year, to 303,500 tons in 1984, revealing the impact of the drought on rain-dependent crops. In 1985 wheat and barley crops rebounded to 1.7 million tons and 740,000 tons, respectively. In 1984, Syria grew a record 60,000 tons of corn.

Earlier stagnation of agricultural output meant primarily stagnation of grain production. Instead of exporting wheat, in the 1980s Syria became a net importer. In 1985, Syria imported 1.4 million tons of wheat, worth more than LS 800 million. In addition, cereal imports rose from LS 368 million in 1982 to LS 1.6 billion in 1984, amounting to 56 percent of the LS 2.85 billion bill for food imports that year.

During the 1970s and 1980s, the government encouraged greater grain production by providing improved high-yield seeds, raising prices paid to farmers, and urging shifts toward wheat growing on some irrigated land formerly planted in cotton. Its intent was to raise grain output at least to self-sufficiency to ease the pressure on the balance of payments. Beginning in the late 1970s, the government showed increased interest in improving rain-fed agriculture and acquired funding from the World Bank, International Fund for Agricultural Development, and the UN Development Program for a US$76.3 million project to expand food production and raise the standard of living in Daraa and As Suwayda provinces. In addition, Syrian agriculture benefited from research projects undertaken by the International Center for Agricultural Research in the Dry Areas' (ICARDA) branch office located near Aleppo. ICARDA helped develop the Sham-1 durum wheat and Sham-2 bread wheat used by Syrian farmers in the mid-1980s and demonstrated through its research the positive effect of phosphate fertilizers on barley crops in dry areas, encouraging the government to consider a change in agricultural strategy.

In the 1980s, vegetables and fruits exhibited the fastest growth rates of the various crops, although they started from a low base. Urbanization and rising incomes spurred cultivation of these products, which were also generally exempt from official price control. Fruits and vegetables were grown primarily in the northwest and coastal plain in irrigated fields and where rainfall and groundwater were greatest. However, Syria lagged considerably behind Lebanon in cultivation of fruits and vegetables in similar terrain, and seasonal fruits were consistently smuggled in from Lebanon in the 1980s.

During the Syrian Civil War, the country lost $16 billion of crop and livestock production, in which household livestock ownership has sunk at nearly 50% for each of cattle, sheep, goats and poultry.

Cotton

Syria has produced cotton since ancient times, and its cultivation increased in importance in the 1950s and 1960s. Until superseded by petroleum in 1974, cotton was Syria's most important industrial and cash crop, and the country's most important foreign exchange earner, accounting for about one-third of Syria's export earnings. In 1976, the country was the tenth largest cotton producer in the world and the fourth largest exporter. Almost all the cotton was grown on irrigated land, largely in the area northeast of Aleppo. Syrian cotton was medium staple, similar to cotton produced in other developing countries but of lower quality than the extra-long staple variety produced in Egypt. The cotton was handpicked, although mechanical pickers were tried in the 1970s in an attempt to hold down rising labor costs.

Cotton production (cotton lint) rose from 13,000 tons in 1949 to 180,000 tons in 1965. However, land reform and nationalization of the cotton gins precipitated a sharp decline in output in the next few years. Beginning in 1968 and during the 1970s annual lint production hovered around 150,000 tons. However, in 1983 and 1984, Syria enjoyed a record cotton crop of 523,418 tons, and the third highest yield in the world, estimated at 3 tons per hectare. To a large measure, this increase was attributable to the government's raising cotton procurement prices by 44 percent in 1981–82, and by another 20 percent in 1982–83.

Although the area under cotton cultivation has declined since the early 1960s, yields have increased as a result of improved varieties of seed and increasing amounts of fertilizer. The area planted dropped from over 250,000 hectares in the early 1960s to 140,000 hectares in 1980. In response to the jump in procurement prices by 1984, it increased to 178,000 hectares. As domestic consumption of cotton increased in the 1960s and 1970s, the government built several textile mills to gain the value added from exports of fabrics and clothes compared with exports of raw cotton. In the 1980s, cotton exports averaged 120,000 tons, ranging from a low of 72,800 tons to a record of 151,000 tons in 1983. Syria's seed cotton harvest was 462,000 tons in 1985, about 3 percent higher than in 1984. Approximately 110,000 tons of the 1985 harvest were destined for export markets. Major foreign customers in 1985 included the Soviet Union (18,000 tons), Algeria (14,672 tons), Italy (13,813 tons), and Spain (10,655 tons).

The government's goal of expanding and diversifying food production created intense competition for irrigated land and encouraged the practice of double cropping. Because cotton did not lend itself to double cropping, the cultivated cotton area was declining in real terms. However, the area under cultivation and significance of other industrial crops substantially increased during the 1980s. For example, the government initiated policies designed to stimulate sugar beet cultivation to supply the sugar factories built in the 1970s and 1980s. The area under cultivation for sugar beets rose from 22,000 hectares in 1980 to 35,700 hectares in 1984, with sugar beet harvests totaling over 1 million tons in 1984. Syria, however, still imported LS 287 million worth of sugar in 1984. USDA estimated that Syria would achieve tobacco self-sufficiency in 1985, with harvests of 12.3 million tons (dry weight) compared with 12.2 million tons in 1984. Although yields per hectare fell slightly in 1985, USDA expected imports to match exports. In 1984, Syria imported 559 tons of tobacco and exported 225 tons. Other important commercial crops included olives and tomatoes.

References

Country studies